The Church of England, like the other autonomous member churches of the Anglican Communion, has its own system of canon law.

The principal body of canon law enacted since the Reformation is the Book of Canons approved by the Convocations of Canterbury and York in 1604 and 1606 respectively. There are 141 canons in the collection, some of which reaffirm medieval prescriptions, while others depend on Matthew Parker's Book of Advertisements and the Thirty-nine Articles. They were drawn up in Latin by Richard Bancroft, Bishop of London, and only the Latin text is authoritative. They were published in separate Latin and English editions in 1604. A few, e.g. canon 37, were amended in the 19th century. A Canon Law Commission was appointed in 1939 to reconsider the matter of canon law in the Church of England: it held eight sessions between 1943 and 1947 and then issued a report which included a full set of new canons which were subsequently considered by Convocation.

The new Canons of the Church of England were promulged by the Convocations in 1964 (Canterbury) and 1969 (York), and replaced the whole of the 1604 Canons except the proviso to Canon 113 (which relates to Confession).  The 7th edition, incorporating amendments made by the General Synod up to 2010, was published in 2012. An updated version is available online.

See also
Canon law (Anglican Communion)
Ecclesiastical Law Society
Excommunicato interdictur omnis actus legitimus, ita quod agere non potest, nec aliquem convenire, licet ipse ab aliis possit conveniri

References

Further reading
Bullard, J. V., ed. (1934) Constitutions and Canons Ecclesiastical, 1604: Latin and English. London: Faith Press 
Archbishops' Commission on Canon Law (1947) The Canon Law of the Church of England; being the report of the ... commission ... together with proposals for a revised body of canon law. London: Society for Promoting Christian Knowledge

External links
 Canons of the Church of England: introduction
 Canons of the Church of England (complete text)
 Canons of the Church of England (7th edition)

 
Anglican theology and doctrine
English law